Korogwe District also known as Korogwe District Council is one of the eleven districts of Tanga Region in Tanzania. It is bordered to the northeast by the Lushoto District and north by Bumbuli District. Korogwe District also bordered to the east by the Mkinga District and the Muheza District, to the South by the Handeni Rural District and the Korogwe Urban District, and to the West by the Kilimanjaro Region. The highest point in Korogwe District is Mafi Peak at 1,442m.

According to the 2012 Tanzania National Census, the population of Korogwe Rural District was 242,038.

Administrative subdivisions
As of 2012, Korogwe Rural District was administratively divided into 20 wards.

Wards

 Bungu
 Chekelei
 Dindira
 Kizara
 Kerenge

 Kizara
 Kwagunda
 Kwashemshi
 Lutindi
 Magamba Kwalukonge

 Magoma
 Makuyuni
 Mashewa
 Mazinde
 Mkalamo

 Mkomazi
 Mombo
 Mpale
 Mswaha
 Vugiri

Education & Health 
As of 2022, there were 165 Schools in Korogwe District, 138 of are primary schools and 27 are secondary schools.

In Terms of Healthcare facilities, as of 2022 Korogwe District is home to 3 health centers,1 hospitals and 48 clinics.

References

Districts of Tanga Region